Antonietta Stefanini (3 December 1926 – 18 January 2016), best known as Antonella Steni, was an Italian actress, voice actress, comedian and presenter.

Career
Born in Montefiascone, Steni started her career as a child actress in the stage company led by Wanda Osiris. She debuted as a soubrette in 1942, in the revue Orlando Curioso.

In the 1950s Steni started a long collaboration in radio, on stage and later on television with Elio Pandolfi. They were both part of the company  Teatro Comico Musicale di Radio Roma, and in the 1960s they got a large success with a series of satirical musical comedies written by Dino Verde, particularly Scanzonatissimo and Urgentissimo.

In the 1980s Steni formed a successful stage company together with Riccardo Garrone. Steni was also active in films and as a dubber.

Filmography

References

External links
 

1926 births
2016 deaths
20th-century Italian actresses
Italian stage actresses
Italian film actresses
Italian voice actresses
Italian radio personalities
Italian television personalities
Italian radio presenters
People from the Province of Viterbo
Italian women radio presenters